Tom Dore is a retired American basketball player and former Comcast SportsNet play-by-play announcer for the National Basketball Association's Chicago Bulls.

A native of Northlake, Illinois, the 7'2" (218 cm) Dore played basketball at East Leyden High School in Franklin Park, Illinois, where he was an All-America honoree during the mid-1970s.  Dore then played at the University of Missouri, where he appeared in two NCAA Tournaments and became the school's all-time leader in tournament blocked shots.  Afterwards, he played professionally in France and New Zealand before turning to a broadcasting career.  During the 1980s and early 1990s, he did color commentary and play-by-play work for The University of Texas, Southern Methodist University and the University of Missouri sports events on the radio.

Dore joined the Chicago Bulls broadcasting crew in 1991. The trio of 7'2" (218 cm) Dore, 6'9" (206 cm) color commentator Johnny "Red" Kerr, and 6'11" (211 cm) color commentator Stacey King arguably formed one of the tallest broadcasting crews in sports history.

On May 6, 2008, Dore was let go by the Chicago Bulls and replaced by Neil Funk, the former Bulls radio play-by-play man. Along with Dore leaving, the Bulls' WGN-TV play-by-play man Wayne Larrivee was also let go. Johnny "Red" Kerr, who did all games on Comcast SportsNet and WGN, had his role reduced, working only pre-game and half-time shows for home games.

Dore was also the radio voice of the Arena Football League's Chicago Rush.  For two of those seasons his color man was former sports-radio "shock-jock" Mike North.

Notes

External links
Profile at bulls.com

Living people
American expatriate basketball people in France
American expatriate basketball people in New Zealand
National Basketball Association broadcasters
Arena football announcers
Basketball players from Illinois
Centers (basketball)
Chicago Bulls announcers
College basketball announcers in the United States
College football announcers
Missouri Tigers men's basketball players
People from Northlake, Illinois
East Leyden High School alumni
American men's basketball players
Year of birth missing (living people)